The 1996 Purolator 500 was the fourth stock car race of the 1996 NASCAR Winston Cup Series and the 37th iteration of the event. The race was held on Sunday, March 10, 1996, in Hampton, Georgia at Atlanta Motor Speedway, a  permanent asphalt quad-oval intermediate speedway. The race took the scheduled 328 laps to complete. With the help of a fast final pit stop with 38 laps to go, Richard Childress Racing driver Dale Earnhardt would manage to charge to the front and secure his 70th career NASCAR Winston Cup Series victory and his second and final victory of the season. To fill out the top three, Terry Labonte and Jeff Gordon, both drivers for Hendrick Motorsports, would finish second and third, respectively.

Background 

Atlanta Motor Speedway (formerly Atlanta International Raceway) is a 1.522-mile race track in Hampton, Georgia, United States, 20 miles (32 km) south of Atlanta. It has annually hosted NASCAR Winston Cup Series stock car races since its inauguration in 1960.

The venue was bought by Speedway Motorsports in 1990. In 1994, 46 condominiums were built over the northeastern side of the track. In 1997, to standardize the track with Speedway Motorsports' other two intermediate ovals, the entire track was almost completely rebuilt. The project made the track one of the fastest on the NASCAR circuit.

Entry list 

 (R) - denotes rookie driver.

Qualifying 
Qualifying was split into two rounds. The first round was held on Friday, March 8, at 12:30 PM EST. Each driver would have one lap to set a time. During the first round, the top 25 drivers in the round would be guaranteed a starting spot in the race. If a driver was not able to guarantee a spot in the first round, they had the option to scrub their time from the first round and try and run a faster lap time in a second round qualifying run, held on Saturday, March 9, at 11:00 AM EST. As with the first round, each driver would have one lap to set a time. For this specific race, positions 26-38 would be decided on time, and depending on who needed it, a select amount of positions were given to cars who had not otherwise qualified but were high enough in owner's points.

Three drivers would fail to qualify: Jeff Burton, Steve Seligman, and Randy MacDonald.

Full qualifying results

Race results

References 

1996 NASCAR Winston Cup Series
NASCAR races at Atlanta Motor Speedway
March 1996 sports events in the United States
1996 in sports in Georgia (U.S. state)